Western Pacific Airlines, or WestPac, was an airline which operated in the United States from 1995 to 1998.  A low-cost carrier, it was formed in 1994 under the name Commercial Air, later changed to Western Pacific, and began operating scheduled passenger flights on April 28, 1995, with eight Boeing 737-300s.  Edward Gaylord of Gaylord Entertainment Company was involved in the formation and management of the airline. Its headquarters were in unincorporated El Paso County, Colorado, near Colorado Springs.

Originally based at Colorado Springs Airport, Western Pacific routes were mainly west of the Mississippi River. Routes were extended to the eastern U.S. and on the west coast as new Boeing 737-300 aircraft were acquired. At one point the airline operated leased Boeing 727-200 jetliners as well. The airline declared bankruptcy in February 1998 and ceased operations.

Color in the Sky

The WestPac livery could be encountered in variations on the basic Western Pacific livery, but most aircraft were painted in logojet schemes. They included advertisements for:
 Stardust Resort & Casino – Las Vegas, Nevada (N950WP)
 Purgatory Ski Resort – Durango, Colorado (N946WP)
 Womack's Casino – Cripple Creek, Colorado (N962WP)
 Crested Butte Resort – Gunnison, Colorado (N953WP)
 The Broadmoor – Colorado Springs, Colorado (N947WP)
 Thrifty Car Rental – U.S. car rental chain (N961WP)
 ProRodeo Hall of Fame and Museum of the American Cowboy – Colorado Springs, Colorado (N375TA)
 The Simpsons – FOX–TV television show (N949WP)
 Spirit of Durango – City of Durango, Colorado Board of Tourism (N946WP)
 Security Service Federal Credit Union – Colorado Credit Union (N948WP)
 Colorado Tech University – Denver, Colorado & Colorado Springs, Colorado (N503AU)
 Colorado Springs – City of Colorado Springs, Colorado Board of Tourism (N951WP)
 Sam's Town – Boyd Gaming properties in Las Vegas, Nevada; Kansas City, Missouri; and Tunica, Mississippi (N955WP and N956WP)

The company also had other schemes with no corporate affiliations or advertising. They were:
 Spring Fling Jet (N962WP)
 “Beat the System” (N301AU)
 Winter Wonder Plane (N962WP)
 Super Summer Saver Jet (N962WP)
 Future Logo Jet (N372US)

A marketing promotion with Rupert Murdoch’s American Fox network was broadcast nationwide in September 1995. During the episode, “Who Shot Mr. Burns?” of The Simpsons, callers who phoned in with the correct answer won free air travel or other prizes.

Expansion
Western Pacific was involved with the creation of a new commuter airline, Mountain Air Express (MAX), which began operations in 1996 flying Dornier 328 turboprops.  MAX provided passenger feed for Western Pacific at Colorado Springs and later at Denver.

Earlier, Western Pacific had leased two (2) Boeing 727-200 jetliners from Express One International to initiate new service to Washington Dulles International Airport (IAD) during the airline's expansion in 1995.

Decline
In 1989 Denver announced that Denver International Airport would replace Stapleton International Airport. Since the airport was self-funded it would charge higher-than-normal landing fees to pay back the bonds. Denver International Airport was also twice as far from Denver as Stapleton International Airport. Shortly before the opening of the airport Continental Airlines shut down their Denver hub, leaving Denver as a hub for only one carrier, United Airlines, whereas Stapleton had once been a hub for airlines like the original Frontier Airlines (1950-1986) and Western Airlines.

Effort was made by airlines to explore using a secondary airport as their hub, taking Stapleton's place in the Denver area without incurring the high landing fees of Denver International Airport. Centennial Airport in Denver, Jeffco Airport in Broomfield and Colorado Springs Airport were considered, although Colorado Springs was chosen as the hub for Western Pacific when the airline first began operating scheduled passenger flights.

While Western Pacific's Colorado Springs hub had initially been successful and was beginning to divert traffic away from Denver, by 1997 the airline had not made a profit in two years of operation. Colorado Springs Airport is south of the Denver metropolitan area, limiting its appeal to front range travelers from much the Denver area.  Western Pacific executives decided to move the hub from Colorado Springs to Denver International Airport in 1997.

A day after the move to Denver was completed, Western Pacific announced it would "purchase" the competing Denver-based  Frontier Airlines (another new start up air carrier which initiated scheduled passenger flights during the 1990s and used the same name as the original Frontier Airlines (1950-1986) which in turn had acquired Continental's former gates at the Denver International Airport. The two carriers would immediately enter into a code sharing agreement with the Frontier flight schedule being secondary to Western Pacific's schedule. Western Pacific then shelved plans to expand their Colorado Springs hub.

The merger process with Frontier then began.  However, after Frontier gained access to Western Pacific's financial records as a part of the due diligence process, Frontier and their bankers then decided to no longer pursue this opportunity and the merger was abruptly canceled, leading to Western Pacific's bankruptcy and also nearly destroying Frontier in the process.

Western Pacific declared Chapter 7 bankruptcy in February 1998. Frontier Airlines survived and currently operates a jet fleet that is approximately twice the size of the proposed combined Western Pacific-Frontier operation.

Destinations

The airline served the following destinations in the U.S. during its existence:

 Atlanta (Hartsfield–Jackson Atlanta International Airport) – ATL
 Chicago (Chicago Midway International Airport) – MDW
 Colorado Springs (Colorado Springs Airport) – COS – Original Hub
 Dallas/Fort Worth, Texas (Dallas/Fort Worth International Airport) – DFW
 Denver (Stapleton International Airport then replaced by Denver International Airport) – DEN – Subsequent Hub
 Houston (George Bush Intercontinental Airport) – IAH
 Indianapolis (Indianapolis International Airport) – IND
 Kansas City (Kansas City International Airport) – MCI (also served by codeshare partner Mountain Air Express)
 Las Vegas (Harry Reid International Airport) – LAS
 Los Angeles (Los Angeles International Airport) – LAX
 Miami (Miami International Airport) – MIA
 Nashville (Nashville International Airport) – BNA
 Newark (Newark Liberty International Airport) – EWR
 Oklahoma City (Will Rogers World Airport) – OKC (also served by codeshare partner Mountain Air Express)
 Ontario (Ontario International Airport) – ONT
 Orlando (Orlando International Airport) – MCO
 Phoenix (Phoenix Sky Harbor International Airport) – PHX
 Portland (Portland International Airport) – PDX
 San Antonio (San Antonio International Airport) – SAT
 San Diego (San Diego International Airport) – SAN
 San Francisco (San Francisco International Airport) – SFO
 San Jose (Norman Y. Mineta San Jose International Airport) – SJC
 Seattle/Tacoma (Seattle–Tacoma International Airport) – SEA
 Tulsa (Tulsa International Airport) – TUL (also served by codeshare partner Mountain Air Express)
 Washington, D.C. (Washington Dulles International Airport) – IAD
 Wichita (Wichita Dwight D. Eisenhower National Airport) – ICT

Mountain Air Express destinations

Mountain Air Express (MAX) served the following destinations on behalf of Western Pacific via a code sharing agreement. MAX was a wholly owned subsidiary of Western Pacific and was created to provide passenger feed.  This regional airline operated  Dornier 328 propjets.

 Albuquerque, NM - ABQ
 Aspen, CO - ASE
 Casper, WY - CPR
 Cheyenne, WY - CYS
 Colorado Springs, CO - COS
 Denver, CO - DEN
 Grand Junction, CO - GJT
 Gunnison, CO - GUC
 Hayden/Steamboat Springs, CO - HDN
 Kansas City, MO - MCI
 Oklahoma City, OK - OKC
 Salt Lake City, UT - SLC
 Santa Fe, NM - SAF
 Tulsa, OK - TUL

Fleet
 2 - Boeing 727-200 - leased from Express One in order to facilitate new routes
 20 - Boeing 737-300 - main jet aircraft type in fleet
 Boeing 737-700 - on order at the time of cessation of all scheduled service (these aircraft were never delivered)

Codeshare partner Mountain Air Express operated Dornier 328 turboprop aircraft.

See also 
 List of defunct airlines of the United States

References

External links

 Images of all Western Pacific's logo-jets
 Western Pacific Airlines (Archive)
 historical overview

Airlines established in 1994
Airlines disestablished in 1998
Companies based in Colorado Springs, Colorado
Companies that have filed for Chapter 7 bankruptcy
Defunct airlines of the United States
Defunct companies based in Colorado
History of Colorado
Ryman Hospitality Properties
Transportation in Colorado Springs, Colorado
1994 establishments in Colorado
1998 disestablishments in Colorado
American companies established in 1994
American companies disestablished in 1998